Sensor Web Enablement (SWE) is a suite of standards developed and maintained by Open Geospatial Consortium. SWE standards enable developers to make all types of sensors, transducers and sensor data repositories discoverable, accessible and usable via the Web.

SWE Standards include:
 Sensor Observation Service
 Sensor Planning Service
 Observations and Measurements
 Sensor Model Language
 SensorThings API

References 

Open Geospatial Consortium
Internet Standards